The 1978 Dutch TT was the sixth round of the 1978 Grand Prix motorcycle racing season. It took place on the weekend of 22–24 June 1978 at the Circuit van Drenthe Assen.

Classification

500 cc

350cc

250cc

125cc

50cc

Sidecar classification

References

Dutch TT
Dutch
Tourist Trophy